Barkchay (also Romanized as Barkchāy; also known as Bargchāy and Bertchāy) is a village in Arshaq-e Markazi Rural District, Arshaq District, Meshgin Shahr County, Ardabil Province, Iran. As of the 2006 census it had a population of 251 divided between 52 families.

References 

Tageo

Towns and villages in Meshgin Shahr County